Ancylis rostrifera is a moth of the family Tortricidae first described by Edward Meyrick in 1912. It is found in Sri Lanka.

References

Enarmoniini
Moths of Asia
Moths described in 1912
Taxa named by Edward Meyrick